A tube furnace is an electric heating device used to conduct syntheses and purifications of inorganic compounds and occasionally in organic synthesis.  One possible design consists of a cylindrical cavity surrounded by heating coils that are embedded in a thermally insulating matrix.  Temperature can be controlled via feedback from a thermocouple.  More elaborate tube furnaces have two (or more) heating zones useful for transport experiments.  Some digital temperature controllers provide an RS-232 interface, and permit the operator to program segments for uses like ramping, soaking, sintering, and more.  Advanced materials in the heating elements, such as molybdenum disilicide (MoSi2) offered in certain models can now produce working temperatures up to 1800 °C.  This facilitates more sophisticated applications. Common material for the reaction tubes include alumina, Pyrex, and fused quartz, or in the case of corrosive materials molybdenum or tungsten tubes can be used.

The tube furnace was invented in the first decade of the 20th century and was originally used to manufacture ceramic filaments for Nernst lamps and glowers.

Illustrative applications
An example of a material prepared using a tube furnace is the superconductor YBa2Cu3O7.  A mixture of finely powdered CuO, BaO, and Y2O3, in the appropriate molar ratio, contained in a platinum or alumina "boat," is heated in a tube furnace at several hundred degrees under flowing oxygen. Similarly tantalum disulfide is prepared in a tube furnace followed by purification, also in a tube furnace using the technique of chemical vapor transport. Because of the availability of tube furnaces, chemical vapor transport has become a popular technique not only in industry (see van Arkel–de Boer process) but also in the research laboratory. 

Tube furnaces can also be used for thermolysis reactions, involving either organic or inorganic reactants.  One such example is the preparation of ketenes which may employ a tube furnace in the 'ketene lamp'. Flash vacuum pyrolysis often utilize a fused quartz tube, usually packed with quartz or ceramic beads, which is heated at high temperatures.

References

Furnaces
Laboratory equipment
Kilns

ru:Трубчатая_печь